The Stokes Magnetic Anomaly (also known as the  Stokes Magnetic Anomaly System, SMAS,  New Zealand Junction Magnetic Anomaly, JMA, great Nelson magnetic disturbance, Junction Anomaly, Campbell Magnetic Anomaly System, CMAS) is a magnetic anomaly on the earth's surface that extends from New Caledonia to the Chatham Rise with complexity consistent with the theory of plate tectonics.

History

It is named after Captain (later Admiral) John Lort Stokes by G. C. Farr in 1916 as he described it first  although such naming has proved controversial, hence many of the alternative names. The magnetic declinations were observed by Captain Stokes when captaining HMS Acheron and Commander (later Admiral) Byron Drury in HMS Pandora between 1851 and 1853.

Geology
Where the anomaly crosses New Zealand it is displaced by approximately right angle changes in direction for a total of  running down the western side of New Zealand from the Northland Peninsula in the North Island to Fiordland but then exiting New Zealand's South Island on its Otago east coast.

The Stokes Magnetic Anomaly has been related to magnetic anomaly extending in Australia as the east Lachlan Fold Belt or New England Fold Belt as an extension of where it commences near the western Challenger Plateau and Lord Howe Rise. This gives an age of up to 83 million years before present in its formation but alternatively, it may be extended to represent the earliest ocean crust formed between New Zealand and Marie Byrd Land in Antarctica so could be even older.

External links

References

Magnetic anomalies
Geomagnetism
Zealandia
Continental fragments
Continents
Geology of New Zealand
Geography of New Caledonia
Geography of Oceania
Geography of the New Zealand seabed